Al-Shirqat Sports Club is an Iraqi football team based in Al-Shirqat, Saladin, that plays in Iraq Division one.

History

Early years
Al-Shirqat Club was founded on May 5, 1992 and played in the Division Four in 1993 for two seasons. Then the team qualified to the Division Three in 1995 and played in it until 1999. They were promoted to the Division Two in 1999 and to the Division One in 2007 when they won the Division Two with Al-Dour SC from Saladin Governorate.

in Premier League
Al-Shirqat team played in the Iraqi Premier League for the first time in the 2009–10 season, and played in the Northern Group, and the team was not good enough, and eventually relegated to the Iraq Division One. After one season, the team returned to play again in the Premier League, after winning the Iraq Division One championship, but its results in the league were not good. At the end of the 2011–12 season, they finished in penultimate place and were relegated to the Iraq Division One.

Managerial history
  Adel Khudhair
  Karim Saddam
  Mohammed Attiya 
  Farhan Hamad

Honours
Iraq Division One (second tier)
Winners: 2008–09 (shared), 2010–11
Iraq Division Two (third tier)
Winners: 2006–07 (shared)

References

External links
 Al-Shirqat SC on Goalzz.com
 Iraq Clubs- Foundation Dates
 

1992 establishments in Iraq
Football clubs in Saladin